This article is a list of diseases of the cultivated oat Avena sativa.

Bacterial diseases

Fungal diseases

Miscellaneous diseases or disorders

Nematodes

Viruses 

Oats

Diseases

References 
 Common Names of Diseases, The American Phytopathological Society (APS)